Northwood Hills is a London Underground station on the Metropolitan line in the area of Northwood, between Northwood and Pinner stations and is in Travelcard Zone 6.

History
The station opened on 13 November 1933. There was a competition for the name and Northwood Hills, suggested by a woman from North Harrow was the winning entry. The area is lower than Northwood, despite the name.

Services
In the northbound direction the station is served by trains to Watford (4tph), Amersham (2tph) and Chesham (2tph) trains (at peak times, 'fast' trains do not stop at stations between Harrow-on-the-Hill and Moor Park). In the southbound direction off-peak services generally run 4tph to Baker Street and 4tph to Aldgate.

Connections
London Buses routes 282, H11 and H13 serve the station.

References

Gallery

External links

  Site of Northwood Hills station before its construction, 1931. Sign advertises coming station.
 www.railwayarchive.org.uk Northwood Hills station on its opening day, 1933.

Metropolitan line stations
Tube stations in the London Borough of Hillingdon
Former Metropolitan and Great Central Joint Railway stations
Railway stations in Great Britain opened in 1933